Halgerda azteca is a species of sea slug, a dorid nudibranch, shell-less marine gastropod mollusks in the family Discodorididae.

Distribution
This species was described from 3 specimens collected at Banc Aztèque, and Banc Jumeau east, Norfolk Ridge, New Caledonia in depths of 230–367 m.

References

Discodorididae
Gastropods described in 2000